The Études by Frédéric Chopin are three sets of études (solo studies) for the piano published during the 1830s. There are twenty-seven compositions overall, comprising two separate collections of twelve, numbered Op. 10 and Op. 25, and a set of three without opus number.

History

Composition
Chopin's Études formed the foundation for what was then a revolutionary playing style for the piano. They are some of the most challenging and evocative pieces of all the works in concert piano repertoire. Because of this, the music remains popular and often performed in both concert and private stages. Some are so popular they have been given nicknames; among the most popular are Op. 10, No. 3, sometimes identified by the names Tristesse ("Sadness") or "Farewell" (L'Adieu), as well as the "Revolutionary Étude" (Op. 10, No. 12), "Black Keys" (Op. 10, No. 5), and "Winter Wind" (Op. 25, No. 11). No nicknames are of Chopin's original creation.

All twenty-seven études were published during Chopin's lifetime; Op. 10, the first group of twelve, were composed between 1829 and 1832, and were published in 1833, in France, Germany, and England. The twelve études of Op. 25 were composed at various times between 1832 and 1835, and were published in the same countries in 1837. The final three, part of a series called  compiled by Ignaz Moscheles and François-Joseph Fétis, were composed in 1839, without an assigned opus number. They appeared in Germany and France in November 1840, and England in January 1841. Accompanying copies of these important early editions, there are usually several manuscripts of a single étude in Chopin's own hand, and additional copies made by his close friend, Jules Fontana, along with editions of Karol Mikuli, Chopin's student.

The first études of the Opus 10 set were written when Chopin was still in his teens. They rank alongside the early works of Felix Mendelssohn as rare examples of extremely youthful compositions that are regarded as both innovative and worthy of inclusion in the standard canon. Chopin's études elevated the musical form from purely utilitarian exercises to great artistic masterpieces.

Impact
Although sets of exercises for piano had been common from the end of the 18th century (Muzio Clementi, Johann Baptist Cramer, Ignaz Moscheles, and Carl Czerny were composers of the most significant), Chopin's Études not only presented an entirely new set of technical challenges, but were the first to become a regular part of the concert repertoire. His études combine musical substance and technical challenge to form a complete artistic form. They are often held in high regard as the product of mastery of combining the two.

His effect on contemporaries such as Franz Liszt was apparent, based on the revision Liszt made to his series of concert études after meeting Chopin. Other great composers after him, such as Schumann, Debussy, Prokofiev, and Rachmaninoff, wrote études in the same style as Chopin's.

Contemporary Polish musicologist Tadeusz A. Zielinski wrote, on Op. 10, that "not only did they become an orderly demonstration of a new piano style and the formulas peculiar to it, but also an artistic ennoblement of this style." Chopin's Études are not without modern influence as well. Several of the études have lodged themselves in popular music, movies, or television shows.

List of Études

Études Op. 10
The first set of Études was published in 1833 (although some had been written as early as 1829). Chopin was twenty-three years old and already famous as a composer and pianist in the salons of Paris, where he made the acquaintance of Franz Liszt. Subsequently, Chopin dedicated the entire opus to him – "" (to my friend, Franz Liszt).

The etudes 8, 9, 10 and 11 date from October/November 1829, nos. 5 and 6 probably from summer 1830, nos. 1 and 2 from November 2, 1830, no. 12 from September 1831 (?), no. 7 from Spring 1832, no. 4 from August 6, 1832, and no. 3 from August 25, 1832 (Paris) (Krystyna Kobylańska).

Études Op. 25
Chopin's second set of Études was published in 1837, and dedicated to Franz Liszt's mistress, Marie d'Agoult, the reasons for which are a matter of speculation.

The date of composition of all opus 25 Etudes is before June 30, 1835, the date of a contract between Chopin and Breitkopf & Hartel (awarding the publisher the rights for Germany) (Krystyna Kobylanska).

While less technically brilliant than those of Op. 10 and 25, these three études nevertheless retain Chopin's original formula for harmonic and structural balance.

Technical aspects and student guides
Chopin's Études are technically demanding, and require players to have significant experience with speed, arpeggios, and trills even in weaker fingers.

For all études
 Casella, Alfredo. F. Chopin. Studi per pianoforte. Milano: Edizioni Curci, 1946.
 Cortot, Alfred. Frédéric Chopin. 12 Études, op. 10. Édition de travail des oeuvres de Chopin. Paris: Éditions Salabert, 1915.
 Cortot, Alfred. Frédéric Chopin. 12 Études, op. 25. Édition de travail des oeuvres de Chopin. Paris: Éditions Salabert, 1915.
 Galston, Gottfried. Studienbuch [Study Book]. III. Abend [3rd Recital] (Frédéric Chopin). Berlin: Bruno Cassirer, 1910.

For selected études
 Busoni, Ferruccio. Klavierübung in zehn Büchern [Piano Tutorial in Ten Books], zweite umgestaltete und bereicherte Ausgabe. Buch 8 (Variationen und Varianten nach Chopin). Leipzig: Breitkopf & Härtel, 1925.
 Godowsky, Leopold. Studien über die Etüden von Chopin (Studies on Chopin's Etudes). New York: G. Schirmer Inc., 1899 (Berlin: Schlesinger'sche Buch- und Musikhandlung, 1903).
 Joseffy, Rafael. Etudes for the Piano. Instructive Edition. New York: G. Schirmer, 1901.

Paraphrases
 Godowsky, Leopold. 53 Studies on Chopin's Études. New York: G. Schirmer Inc., 1899 (Berlin: Schlesinger'sche Buch- und Musikhandlung, 1903).
 Wührer, Friedrich. Achtzehn Studien zu Frédéric Chopins Etuden [sic] [18 Studies on Chopin's Études]. In Motu Contrario [In Contrary Motion]. Heidelberg: Willy Müller, Süddeutscher Musikverlag, 1958.

See also
Studies on Chopin's Études
List of compositions by Frédéric Chopin

References

Further reading
 Bülow, Hans von. "Remarks on the Separate Studies." In Auserlesene Klavier-Etüden von Fr. Chopin. München: Jos. Aibl, 1880.
 Collet, Robert. "Studies, Preludes and Impromptus." In Frédéric Chopin: Profiles of the Man and the Musician. Ed. Alan Walker. London: Barrie & Rockliff, 1966.
 Czerny, Carl. School of Practical Composition London: R. Cocks & Co., [1848]; Reprint, New York: Da Capo Press, 1979.
 Deschaussées, Monique. Frédéric Chopin: 24 études – vers une interprétation. Fondettes: Van de Velde, 1995.
 Eigeldinger, Jean-Jacques. Chopin: Pianist and Teacher as Seen by his Pupils. Cambridge University Press, 1986
 Ekier, Jan, ed. (National Edition)."About the Etudes." "Performance Commentary." "Source Commentary." Chopin Etudes. Warsaw: Polskie Wydawnictwo Muzyczne, 1999.
 Finlow, Simon. "The Twenty-seven Études and Their Antecedents." In Jim Samson (ed.), The Cambridge Companion to Chopin. Cambridge: Cambridge University Press, 1992.
 Galston, Gottfried. Studienbuch. III. Abend (Frédéric Chopin). Berlin: Bruno Cassirer, 1910.
 Huneker, James. "The Studies—Titanic Experiments." In Chopin: The Man and His Music. New York: Charles Scribner's Sons, 1900.
 Kogosowski, Alan. "Mastering the Chopin Études." A compendium to Chopin: Genius of the Piano. E-Book, 2010.
 Leichtentritt, Hugo. "Die Etüden." In Analyse der Chopin'schen Klavierwerke [Analysis of Chopin's Piano Works]. Band II. Berlin: Max Hesses Verlag, 1922.
 Lear, Angela Chopin's Grande Etudes. February 5, 2007.
 Leontsky, Jan: Interpreting Chopin. Etudes op. 10 & op. 25. Analysis, comments and interpretive choices. Tarnhelm editions.
 Niecks, Frederick. Chopin as a Man and Musician. London: Novello, Ewer and Co., 1888.
 Paderewski, Ignacy Jan, Ludwik Bronarski, Józef Turczynsky, ed. ("Paderewski" Edition). "The Character of the Present Edition." "Commentary." Chopin Studies (Etudes). Warsaw: Instytut Fryderyka Chopina, 1949.
 Samson, Jim. "Baroque reflections." In The Music of Chopin. London: Routledge and Kegan Paul, 1985.
 Schumann, Robert. "Die Pianoforte-Etuden, ihren Zwecken nach geordnet" ["The Pianoforte Études, Categorized According to their Purposes"]. Neue Zeitschrift für Musik No. 11, February 6, 1836, p. 45.
 Zimmermann, Ewald, ed. (Henle Edition). "Kritischer Bericht" (Critical Report). Chopin Etudes. München: G. Henle Verlag, 1983.

External links

Analysis and scores]
 Études Op. 10, Études Op. 25 at Chopin Online, University of Cambridge
 
 Free scores of the Etudes at Mutopia Project
Hans von Bülow's edition of the Études, Opp. 10 and 25 (Munich: J. Aibl, 1880) From Sibley Music Library Digital Scores Collection
 Find entries on select Études and listen to on-demand performances at The Chopin Project site
 Diversity of the Tonal Structure of Chopin's Etudes by Miroslaw Majchrzak. British Postgraduate Musicology, Vol. 10 (2009)

Performances
 , Claudio Arrau
 , Shura Cherkassky
 

 
1833 compositions
1837 compositions
Music dedicated to family or friends